Hatiya may refer to:

Hatiya Upazila an administrative region in Bangladesh
Hatiya Island, a part of Hatiya Upazila
Hatiya, Baglung, a village in Dhaulagiri Zone, Nepal
Hatiya, Sankhuwasabha, a village in Kosi Zone, Nepal
Hatiya, Makwanpur, a village in Narayani Zone, Nepal

See also
Hatia